Highland is a council area in the Scottish Highlands and is the largest local government area in the United Kingdom. It was the 7th most populous council area in Scotland at the 2011 census. It shares borders with the council areas of Aberdeenshire, Argyll and Bute, Moray and Perth and Kinross. Their councils, and those of Angus and Stirling, also have areas of the Scottish Highlands within their administrative boundaries.

The Highland area covers most of the mainland and inner-Hebridean parts of the historic counties of Inverness-shire and Ross and Cromarty, all of Caithness, Nairnshire and Sutherland and small parts of Argyll and Moray. Despite its name, the area does not cover the entire Scottish Highlands.

Name
Unlike the other council areas of Scotland, the name Highland is often not used as a proper noun. The council's website only sometimes refers to the area as being Highland, and other times as being the Highland Council Area or the Highlands. Road signs on the boundary of the council area say "Welcome to the Highlands" rather than "Welcome to Highland".

To many people within the area, using the name Highland as a noun sounds wrong. Dingwall in Highland, for example, sounds strange and is not idiomatic usage. To refer specifically to the area covered by the council, people tend to say the Highland Council area or the Highland area or the Highland region. Otherwise, they may also refer to the traditional county names, such as Ross.

Although named after it, the Highland council area does not cover the entire geographic region of the Scottish Highlands themselves. Other parts belong to the council areas of Aberdeenshire, Angus, Argyll and Bute, Moray, North Ayrshire, Perth and Kinross, Stirling or West Dunbartonshire.

History
In 1975, the area was created as a two-tier region, under the Local Government (Scotland) Act 1973, with an elected council for the whole region and, in addition, elected councils for each of eight districts, Badenoch and Strathspey, Caithness, Inverness, Lochaber, Nairn, Ross and Cromarty, Skye and Lochalsh and Sutherland. The act also abolished county and burgh councils.

In 1996, under the Local Government etc. (Scotland) Act 1994, the Highland Regional Council and the district councils were wound up and their functions were transferred to a new Highland Council. The Highland Council adopted the districts as management areas and created area committees to represent them. However, the boundaries of committee areas ceased to be aligned exactly with those of management areas as a result of changes to ward boundaries in 1999. Ward boundaries changed again in 2007, and the management areas and related committees have now been abolished in favour of three new corporate management areas: Caithness, Sutherland and Easter Ross; Inverness, Nairn and Badenoch and Strathspey; and Ross, Skye and Lochaber. The names of these areas are also names of constituencies, but the boundaries are different.

Geography

The Highland Council is based at the Highland Council Headquarters in Inverness.

The council area covers an area of  – which is 11.4% of the land area of Great Britain, 32.9% of the land area of Scotland and an area 20% larger than Wales.

Though relatively populous for a Scottish council area, it is also sparsely populated. At 9.0 per km2 in 2012, the population density is less than one seventh of Scotland's as a whole, and comparable with that of Bolivia, Chad and Russia. Historically, the area was home to a much higher percentage of Scotland's population. The rural population of the Highlands (both within and outwith the council area) declined in the late 19th century even as Scotland's grew substantially. For example, the population of Skye declined from 23,082 in 1841 to 15,705 in 1891 and a low point of 7,183 in 1971, before growing in more recent decades.

The City of Inverness is by far the largest settlement, with a population of 46,870 in 2012. The urban area around Inverness includes a few outlying villages and has a population of 59,910.

The highest point in the Highland council area is Ben Nevis, the tallest mountain in both Scotland and the United Kingdom as a whole. Its northernmost point is Island of Stroma, in the Pentland Firth. Its southernmost point is on the Morvern peninsula. Despite the name, not all of Highland is mountainous. The areas east of Inverness, as well as the Black Isle, eastern Sutherland, and all of Caithness are, in fact, low-lying.

Gaelic language
According to the 2011 UK census, there are nearly 12,000 Scottish Gaelic speakers in the Highland area.

Politics

Councillors
The Highland Council represents 21 wards, of which each elects three or four councillors by the single transferable vote system of election, to produce a form of proportional representation in a council of 74 members.

Political composition
The 2022 election resulted in the following composition:

After various changes the current make up of the council is:

Members of the Scottish Parliament
For elections to the Scottish Parliament the Highland area is within the Highlands and Islands electoral area, which elects eight first past the post constituency Members of the Scottish Parliament (MSPs) and seven additional member MSPs. Three of the region's constituencies, each electing one MSP, are within the Highland area: Caithness, Sutherland and Ross, Inverness and Nairn and Skye, Lochaber and Badenoch.

The MSPs as at December 2019 are as follows:

Members of Parliament
In the House of Commons of the Parliament of the United Kingdom the Highland area is represented by Members of Parliament (MPs) elected from three constituencies: Caithness, Sutherland and Easter Ross; Inverness, Nairn, Badenoch and Strathspey; and Ross, Skye and Lochaber. Each constituency elects one MP by the first past the post system of election.

As of the 2019 United Kingdom general election, the members of parliament are:

Caithness, Sutherland and Easter Ross: Jamie Stone (Liberal Democrats)
 Inverness, Nairn, Badenoch and Strathspey: Drew Hendry (SNP)
 Ross, Skye and Lochaber: Ian Blackford (SNP)

Towns and villages in the Highland Council Area

 Alness, Altnaharra, Applecross, Ardersier, Ardgour, Ardnamurchan, Aviemore, Avoch, Auldearn
 Back of Keppoch, Ballachulish, Beauly, Bettyhill, (the) Black Isle, Boat of Garten, Bonar Bridge, Broadford, Brora
 Carrbridge, Conon Bridge, Cromarty, Culloden, Cawdor, Croy
 Dalwhinnie, Dingwall, Dornie, Dornoch, Drumnadrochit, Dulnain Bridge, Dunvegan, Durness, Duror (of Appin)
 Fearn, Fort Augustus, Fortrose, Fort William
 Gairloch, Glencoe, Glenfinnan, Golspie, Grantown-on-Spey
 Helmsdale
 Invergarry, Invergordon, Inverie, Invermoriston, Inverness
 John o' Groats
 Kiltarlity (Bràigh na h-Àirde), Kingussie, Kinlochbervie, Kinlochleven, Knoydart, Kyle of Lochalsh
 Lochcarron (Loch Carrann), Lochinver 
 Mallaig, Maryburgh, Muir of Ord
 Nairn, Newtonmore
 North Ballachulish
 Onich
 Plockton, Portmahomack, Portree
 Rosemarkie, Roy Bridge
 Spean Bridge, Strathpeffer, Strontian
 Tain, Thurso, Tongue, Torridon
 Ullapool
 Wick

See also
 Scottish Highlands
 List of places in Highland
 List of places in Argyll and Bute
 List of places in Perth and Kinross
 List of places in Moray
 List of places in the Western Isles
 High Life Highland

Notes

References

External links

 
 The Highland Council
  
 The Highland council area in the Gazetteer for Scotland website
 Scottish Highlands and Islands Film Commission

 
Council areas of Scotland
Highlands and Islands of Scotland
Politics of Highland (council area)
Regions of Scotland
1975 establishments in Scotland